Buchbinder is a surname. Notable people with the surname include:

Bernhard Buchbinder (1849–1922), Austro-Hungarian actor, journalist and writer
David Buchbinder (born 1947), American academic
 Chaim Buchbinder (born 1943), Israeli basketball player
Leslie Buchbinder, American documentary filmmaker 
Rachelle Buchbinder (born 1958), Australian rheumatologist and epidemiologist
Rudolf Buchbinder (born 1946), Austrian classical pianist
Susan Buchbinder, American physician